Alexandr Sergeyevich Prigoda (born 1964) is a Russian swimmer. He qualified for the 1984 Summer Olympics but missed them due to the boycott by the Soviet Union. He competed in the Friendship Games instead and won a gold medal in the 200 m and silver medal in the 100 m butterfly events. He won multiple nation titles in senior and masters categories (2001–2009).

He started swimming in a club aged 7, together with his younger brother, Gennadiy Prigoda, a Russian former Olympic swimmer.

References

1964 births
Living people
Russian male swimmers
Male butterfly swimmers
Soviet male swimmers